Laurent Waller (born 28 December 1966) is a Swiss fencer. He competed in the individual sabre event at the 2000 Summer Olympics.

References

External links
 

1966 births
Living people
Swiss male sabre fencers
Olympic fencers of Switzerland
Fencers at the 2000 Summer Olympics